Spacejacked is a 1997 American Irish film. It was made for Concorde Anois, a studio Roger Corman ran in Galway.

Plot
In the near future, a spaceship on a luxury cruise to the moon is taken over by Barnes, an evil computer expert, who plants a bomb on the craft in an attempt to get all of the wealthy passengers' bank account numbers.

Cast
Corbin Bernsen as Barnes
Bill Murphy as Jack
Amanda Pays
Ciara O'Callaghan

References

External links
Spacejacked at IMDb
Spacejacked at BFI

Irish science fiction films
1997 films
1990s English-language films